No. 670 Squadron RAF was a glider squadron of the Royal Air Force active during the Second World War.

History
No. 670 Squadron was formed at Fatehjang, Punjab, (then) British India on 14 December 1944 as a glider squadron, with the intention of being used for airborne operations by South East Asia Command. It continued to train, as part of No. 343 Wing RAF, until the surrender of Japan, when it became surplus to requirements. The squadron was disbanded on 1 July 1946 at Chaklala, Punjab, British India.

Present
The squadron today is represented by 670 Squadron of 7 (Training) Regiment, Army Air Corps.

See also
No. 670 Squadron AAC

Aircraft operated

Squadron bases

References

Notes

Bibliography

External links
 History of No.'s 651–670 Squadrons at RAF Web

Aircraft squadrons of the Royal Air Force in World War II
670 Squadron